Parmjeet Singh Sohi, popularly known as Sardar Sohi is an Indian Punjabi actor and writer. He is from Palasaur near Dhuri. He is best known for the films Baghi, The Legend of Bhagat Singh and Ardaas. Sohi started his Punjabi film career with Long Da Lishkara, which was released in 1986.

Filmography

Awards and nominations

References

External links
 

Living people
Male actors from Punjab, India
20th-century Indian male actors
21st-century Indian male actors
Indian male film actors
1949 births